Poznań uprising can refer to:
 Greater Poland Uprising (1846)
 Greater Poland Uprising (1848)
 Greater Poland Uprising (1918–1919)
 Poznań 1956 protests